Honningsvåg (or historically, Honningsvaag) may refer to:

Places
Honningsvåg, a town in Nordkapp municipality in Finnmark county, Norway
Honningsvåg Church, a church in the town of Honningsvåg in Finnmark county, Norway
Honningsvåg Airport, an airport serving the town of Honningsvåg in Finnmark county, Norway
Honningsvåg Tunnel, a tunnel in Nordkapp municipality in Finnmark county, Norway

Other
 , a naval trawler that served throughout the Second World War as a patrol boat in the Royal Norwegian Navy